Raičević is a Serbian and Montenegrin surname. It may refer to:

Giovanni Raicevich (1881-1957), Italian martial artist
Milena Raičević (born 1990), Montenegrin handball player
Mirko Raičević (born 1982), Montenegrin footballer
Milivoje Raičević, Serbian footballer
Miroslav Raičević (born 1981), Serbian basketballer
Nemanja Raičević (born 1976), Serbian short story writer
Darko Raičević, Montenegrin runner
Nikola Raičević, Montenegrin taekwondo
Goran Raičević, Yugoslav track athlete, distance runner
Slobodan Raičević, Yugoslav writer
Vlado Raičević, Montenegrin politician
Momčilo Raičević, former footballer
Nebojša Raičević, former footballer
Filip Raičević, (born 1993) Montenegrin footballer
Budimir Raičević, RTCG director
Tomica Raičević, Serbian politician

See also
Rajčević (disambiguation)

Serbian surnames
Montenegrin surnames